Brentford Football Club is an English professional football club based in Brentford, Hounslow, London. Between 1897 and 1920, the first team competed in the London League, Southern League and Western League. Since 1920, the first team has competed in the Football League, the Premier League and other nationally and internationally organised competitions. All players who have played between 1 and 24 such matches are listed below.

Records and notable players 
Players who finished their Brentford careers with 24 appearances are Micky Cook, Joe Craddock, Ryan Denys, Micky Droy, Brian Etheridge, Tommy Finney, Scott Fitzgerald, John Halls, Tommy Leigh, Roddy McLeod, Sammy Moore, Sidney Mulford, Mark Peters and Harry Stott. Roddy McLeod scored 14 goals in his 24 appearances and is the highest scorer on this list.

Campbell (1895), John Cairns, Herbert Farnfield, C. W. Fox, Bernard Kelly, James Lockwood, J. McMillan, Thomas Meehan, Montell Moore, William Price, Jerrome Sobers and Bobby Wilson finished their Brentford careers having scored on their only appearance for the club. C. Ward scored 9 goals in six appearances and Richard Sloley scored seven goals in six appearances. 'A. Newman' (an alias) scored two goals on his sole appearance in 1898 and L. Ingram scored two goals in his two appearances.

Current Brentford players who have made between 1 and 24 appearances are Aaron Hickey, Mads Bidstrup, Mikkel Damsgaard, Halil Dervişoğlu, Alex Gilbert, Charlie Goode, Keane Lewis-Potter, Myles Peart-Harris, Aaron Pressley, Kevin Schade, Fin Stevens, Thomas Strakosha, Ryan Trevitt, Joel Valencia, Yehor Yarmolyuk and Nathan Young-Coombes.

Key
Appearance and goal totals include matches in the Premier League, Football League, Southern League, London League (1896–1898) FA Cup, League Cup, Football League Trophy, Anglo-Italian Cup, London Challenge Cup, Middlesex Senior Cup, London Junior Cup, Middlesex Junior Cup, West Middlesex Cup, Southern Floodlit Challenge Cup, Football League Jubilee Fund and Empire Exhibition Cup. Substitute appearances are included. Wartime matches are regarded as unofficial and are excluded.
 "Brentford career" corresponds to the years in which the player made their first and last appearances.
 Players listed in bold won full international caps whilst with the club.
 Statistics are correct as of match played 11 March 2023.
 Starting lineups are untraced prior to the beginning of the 1893–94 season.

Playing positions

Players

Early years (1889–1898)

Southern League era (1898–1920)

Interwar era (1920–1945)

Post-war era (1945–2000)

21st century (2000–present)

Notes

References
General

Brentford at Soccerbase.
.

Specific

 1-24
Brentford 1-24
Players 1-24
Players 1-24
Association football player non-biographical articles